Colin's Sandwich is a British sitcom that was broadcast on BBC2 in 1988 and 1990. It starred Mel Smith as Colin Watkins, a British Rail administrator who aspired to be a horror writer. The show was written by Paul Smith and Terry Kyan and ran for two series of six episodes (18 October – 22 November 1988 and 12 January – 16 February 1990). In the second series, Colin manages to achieve some small successes as a writer.

Premise

The central character, Colin Watkins, is an educated, intelligent, neurotic man in his mid-thirties.   By day he works in a dead-end job for the now defunct British Rail in their complaints department.   He frequently has to listen all day to (and attempt to appease) a combination of complainants and abusive customers.   At the time the series was broadcast, British Rail had a poor reputation for its performance.   While the job involves mundane tasks such as photocopying and dealing with customers, Colin dreams of being a horror author.

Colin lives alone in a top-floor flat though his girlfriend Jenny and best friend Des often share time with him there.   Jenny and Colin are revealed to have met at university and share a sexual relationship – though there is no reference to any permanence in the relationship.

Colin is portrayed as a neurotic who often turns to alcohol (whisky or white wine) in times of trouble and/or success. Jenny is much more down-to-earth and, while she enjoys Colin's company, she is a stable figure in his life.

All in all, Colin tries to do the right thing in the numerous situations he ends up in (being bored by friends' endless dreary dinner parties, finding a dead cat and returning it to its owner, going on holiday while continually fretting about leaving appliances on in his flat).   However, Colin is often conflicted and has a borderline depressive attitude to life – brought about in one episode by his colleague leaving British Rail for pastures new who encourages Colin to do the same.

In Series 1, the long-running plot involves Colin submitting one of his few finished novels to John Langley, a tough publisher who includes it in his compilation of horror short stories.

Home Media 
After its original transmission, the second series was repeated on BBC2 during the Summer of 1992, and it was frequently shown on UK Gold during its early years, although the show has rarely been repeated since then. The series was released on DVD by Simply Media on 9 June 2014, nearly a year after Mel Smith's passing. The boxset consisted of both Series 1 and 2.

Episodes

Series 1 (1988)

Series 2 (1990)

References

External links

Colin's Sandwich Unofficial Fan Site

BBC television sitcoms
1988 British television series debuts
1990 British television series endings
1980s British sitcoms
1990s British sitcoms
English-language television shows
Television shows set in London